Crassispira mausseneti is an extinct species of sea snail, a marine gastropod mollusk in the family Pseudomelatomidae, the turrids and allies.

Description
The length of the shell attains 10 mm.

Distribution
Fossils have been found in Eocene strata in the Paris Basin, France.

References

 Cossmann (M.), 1889 Catalogue illustré des coquilles fossiles de l'Éocène des environs de Paris (4ème fascicule). Annales de la Société royale Malacologique de Belgique, t. 24, p. 3-385
 Cossmann (M.) & Pissarro (G.), 1913 Iconographie complète des coquilles fossiles de l'Éocène des environs de Paris, t. 2, p. pl. 46-65
 Le Renard (J.) & Pacaud (J.-M.), 1995 Révision des Mollusques paléogènes du Bassin de Paris. 2 - Liste des références primaires des espèces. Cossmanniana, t. 3, vol. 3, p. 65-132

External links
 MNHN, Paris : Drillia (Crassispira) mausseneti
 Pacaud J.M. & Le Renard J. (1995). Révision des Mollusques paléogènes du Bassin de Paris. IV- Liste systématique actualisée. Cossmanniana. 3(4): 151-187

mausseneti
Gastropods described in 1889